The list of shipwrecks in 1990 includes ships sunk, foundered, grounded, or otherwise lost during 1990.

January

4 January

8 January

9 January

20 January

28 January

29 January

30 January

Unknown date

February

4 February

22 February

27 February

28 February

March

4 March

9 March

14 March

15 March

22 March

29 March

April

2 April

7 April

19 April

25 April

26 April

27 April

29 April

May

1 May

6 May

14 May

15 May

27 May

June

6 June

7 June

19 June

20 June

27 June

July

7 July

14 July

17 July

22 July

30 July

August

3 August

8 August

13 August

19 August

24 August

27 August

31 August

Unknown date

September

1 September

3 September

6 September

9 September

11 September

12 September

13 September

14 September

16 September

23 September

27 September

29 September

Unknown date

October

1 October

8 October

16 October

19 October

24 October

30 October

November

9 November

17 November

22 November

25 November

December

4 December

19 December

22 December

27 December

28 December

31 December

Unknown date

References

1990
 
Ship